Jesús Torres Junquera (born 13 March 1980 in Caldas de Reis, Pontevedra, Galicia) is a Spanish footballer who plays for SD Órdenes as a defender.

External links
 
 Futbolme profile  

1980 births
Living people
Spanish footballers
Footballers from Galicia (Spain)
Association football defenders
Segunda División players
Segunda División B players
Tercera División players
SD Compostela footballers
SD Ponferradina players
CD Eldense footballers